HMS LST-411 was a United States Navy  that was transferred to the Royal Navy during World War II. As with many of her class, the ship was never named. Instead, she was referred to by her hull designation.

Construction
LST-411 was laid down on 21 September 1942, under Maritime Commission (MARCOM) contract, MC hull 931, by the Bethlehem-Fairfield Shipyard, Baltimore, Maryland; launched 9 November 1942; then transferred to the United Kingdom and commissioned on 31 December 1942.

Service history 
LST-411 saw no active service in the United States Navy. There are several reported sinking dates for LST-411: the site [Uboat.net] states that she struck a mine and was lost in action on 26 January 1944; [NavSource.org] claims she was mined or torpedoed 20 February 1944; while the US Navy says she was lost in action 1 January 1944. She was struck from the Navy list on 13 November 1944.

See also 
 List of United States Navy LSTs

Notes 

Citations

Bibliography 

Online resources

External links

 

Ships built in Baltimore
1942 ships
LST-1-class tank landing ships of the Royal Navy
World War II amphibious warfare vessels of the United Kingdom
S3-M2-K2 ships
Maritime incidents in January 1944